Adrian Silviu Zaluschi (born 2 December 1989) is a Romanian professional footballer who plays as a midfielder for CSC Dumbrăvița.

Honours
Ripensia Timișoara
Liga III: 2016–17
Liga IV – Timiș County: 2015–16

Minaur Baia Mare
Liga III: 2020–21

References

 Adrian Zaluschi 2014–15 Liga IV statistics
 Adrian Zaluschi 2016–17 Liga III statistics

External links
 
 
 

1989 births
Living people
Sportspeople from Timișoara
Romanian footballers
Association football midfielders
Liga I players
Liga II players
FC Politehnica Timișoara players
CS ACU Arad players
FC UTA Arad players
FC Ripensia Timișoara players
ACS Poli Timișoara players
FC Dunărea Călărași players
CS Minaur Baia Mare (football) players
SSU Politehnica Timișoara players
CSC Dumbrăvița players